The American Dreamer is a 1971 American documentary film directed by L. M. Kit Carson and Lawrence Schiller. It follows Dennis Hopper at his home and studio during the post-production of the film The Last Movie, which he directed and starred in.

The American Dreamer was never released theatrically, though it was screened at film festivals and on college campuses. The film was thought to be lost for over 30 years, until it was rediscovered, remastered, and released on DVD and Blu-ray in 2016 by Etiquette Pictures.

Release
The American Dreamer was screened at film festivals and on college campuses around the same time as the release of The Last Movie. It did not receive a wide theatrical release.

Critical reception
On the review aggregator website Rotten Tomatoes, the film has an approval rating of 88%, based on eight reviews. In a retrospective assessment, Steven Heller of The Atlantic wrote: "The final cut of The American Dreamer represents a highly-constructed group effort that pushes the limits of documentary." Peter Bradshaw of The Guardian gave the film three out of five stars, writing that the film "tries to be countercultural but the weirdest thing on show is [Hopper's] gun obsession." He concluded that it "has archival value as a study of Hopper and a footnote to the American new wave."

Home media
In 2015, The American Dreamer was restored in 2K and released on DVD and Blu-ray by Etiquette Pictures.

References

External links
 
 

1971 documentary films
1971 films
1970s rediscovered films
American documentary films
Documentary films about film directors and producers
Films directed by Lawrence Schiller
Rediscovered American films
1970s English-language films
1970s American films